Cyperus sexangularis is a species of sedge that is native to south western parts of the Africa.

See also 
 List of Cyperus species

References 

sexangularis
Plants described in 1835
Flora of South Africa
Flora of Botswana
Flora of Zimbabwe
Flora of Namibia
Flora of Swaziland
Taxa named by Christian Gottfried Daniel Nees von Esenbeck